Cusset is a commune in the department of Allier, Auvergne, France.

Cusset may also refer to:

Places
 Canton of Cusset, an administrative division of Allier, Auvergne, France
 Canton of Cusset-Nord, a former administrative division of Allier, Auvergne, France
 Canton of Cusset-Sud, a former administrative division of Allier, Auvergne, France

People
 Catherine Cusset (born 1963), French novelist
 François Cusset (born 1969), French writer, historian, and professor

See also
 Cusseta (disambiguation)